This is the discography page for the industrial band Sister Machine Gun.

Albums

Singles etc.

Compilations
 Afterburn: Wax Trax-94 & Beyond (1994; TVT Records) — "Nothing (Mulatto Mix)"
 Black Box - Wax Trax! Records: The First 13 Years (1994; TVT Records) — "Addiction" from Sins of the Flesh
 Mortal Kombat (soundtrack) (1995; TVT Records) — "Burn" from Burn
 Hideaway (Soundtrack) (1995; TVT Records) — "Lung (Bronchitis Mix)" from Wired/Lung
 Mortal Kombat: More Kombat (1996; TVT Records) — "Deeper Down"
 Wax Trax! Records – Summer Swindle 1996 (Promo sampler, 1996; Wax Trax!/TVT Records) — "Hole in the Ground (Martin Atkins Remix)"
 Scream (Soundtrack) (1996; TVT Records) — "Better Than Me" from Burn
 Resonance  (1997; Decibel Records) — "Bust It"
 Covered In Black: An Industrial Tribute To The Kings Of High Voltage AC/DC (Cleopatra) — "TNT"
 Sonic Adventure Remix (1998; TOSHIBA-EMI Limited Japan) — "Remix of Open Your Heart <Main theme of Sonic Adventure">
  Komposi001 (2002; Positron! Records) — "Damage" and "Bang Bang (Fully Operational Mix)"
  Komposi002 (2003; Positron! Records) — "I Don't Need" and "To Hell With You (Christ Analogue Remix)"
  Komposi003 (2006; Positron! Records) — "Sink"

Videos
 Black Box: Wax Trax! Records, The First 13 Years (A video Retrospective) Volume 1 (1994; TVT Records) — "Not My God" appears on the album Sins of the Flesh
 Black Box: Wax Trax! Records, The First 13 Years (A video Retrospective) Volume 2 (1994; TVT Records) — "Wired" appears on the album The Torture Technique
 SMG 6.0 Record Release Show (VCD, 2001; Positron! Records)
 SMG 6.5 Record Release Show (DVD, 2002; Positron! Records)

Discographies of American artists